Alan W. Paeth (11 May 1956 - 3 June 2018) was a Canadian computer scientist and author.

Life and education

Alan William Paeth was born on May 11, 1956 in Seattle, Washington. He obtained a Bachelor's degree in Computer Science from Caltech and his PhD at the University of Waterloo in 1994. His doctoral advisor was William B. Cowan and his doctoral dissertation was on Linear Models of Reflective Colour. He married Catherine Anne Person in 1983; she predeceased him in 2008.

He died in Kelowna, British Columbia on June 3, 2018.

Career

He was professor of computer science at Okanagan University in British Columbia.

He made major research contributions to computer graphics and has made seminal contributions in the field of Portable Network Graphics including Shear mapping.

Selected publications

His notable books include:

 Graphics Gems V 
 Algorithms for fast color correction 
 The IM raster toolkit : design, implementation and use
 Linear models of reflective colour

References

External links
Alan Paeth
University of Waterloo
University of Waterloo

1956 births
2018 deaths
Canadian computer scientists
University of Waterloo alumni
California Institute of Technology alumni
People from Seattle